John Atkinson (died 1943) was the mayor of Toowoomba, Queensland in 1913 and a former Queensland wrestling champion.  Born in Cumberland, England, he came to Australia in 1878 took jobs first as a schoolteacher and then as a businessman. He was a Toowoomba City Council alderman in 1907 and from 1910 to 1912.  He died on 19 May 1943.

References

1943 deaths
Mayors of Toowoomba
People from Cumberland
Queensland local councillors
Australian male sport wrestlers
Australian wrestlers
Year of birth missing